The languages of South America can be divided into three broad groups: 

 the languages of the (in most cases, former) colonial powers;
 many indigenous languages, some of which are co-official alongside the colonial languages;
 and various pockets of other languages spoken by immigrant populations.

Main languages
Spanish is the most spoken language of South America with Portuguese as a close second.

Other official languages with substantial number of speakers are:

 English in Guyana, Trinidad and Tobago and the Falkland Islands
 Spanish in Colombia, Venezuela, Ecuador, Peru, Bolivia, Chile, Argentina, Paraguay, and Uruguay
 Portuguese in Brazil and Uruguay
 Dutch in Suriname
 French in French Guiana
 Aymara in Bolivia and Peru
 Guaraní in Bolivia and Paraguay
 Quechua in Bolivia, Ecuador, and Peru

Indigenous languages 

Indigenous languages of South America include, among several others, the Quechua languages in Bolivia, Ecuador, and Peru and to a lesser extent in Argentina, Chile, and Colombia; Guaraní in Paraguay and to a much lesser extent in Argentina and Bolivia; Aymara in Bolivia and Peru and to a lesser extent in Chile; Wayuu in northern Colombia and northwest Venezuela; and Mapudungun in small pockets of southern Chile and Argentina.

In Bolivia, three languages—Quechua, Aymara, and Tupi Guarani—are co-official alongside Spanish. In Paraguay, Guarani shares joint official status with Spanish. In Colombia, the languages of the country's ethnic groups are constitutionally recognized as official languages in their territories; more than 60 such aboriginal languages exist today. Ecuador uses Spanish, Northern Quechua, and Shuar as official languages for intercultural relations. In Peru, Quechua and Aymara, as well as other indigenous languages, are co-official in the areas where they are predominant. There are many other languages once spoken in South America that are extinct today (such as the extinct languages of the Marañón River basin).

In Brazil, there are around 135 indigenous languages confirmed. The regions with the most speakers are northern and southern Brazil, where there is a larger concentration of native people. Indigenous populations have been trying to keep their traditions of their homeland, with the help of Funai, the agency responsible for the protection of the native people.

Rapa Nui is a Polynesian language spoken on Easter Island, Chile.

Classification

Macro-Chibchan
Chibchan
Chibcha-Duit, Tunebo, Arhuaco, Cuna-Cueva, Guaymi-Dorasque, Talamanca, Rama-Guatuso
Misumalpan, Paya, Xinca, Lenca
Shiriana
Paezan
Choco, Cuaiquer, Andaki, Paez-Coconuco, Colorado-Cayapa, Warrau, Mura-Matanawi, Jirajira, Yunca, Atacameno, Itonama
Andean-Equatorial
Andean
Ona, Yahgan, Alacaluf, Tehuelche, Puelche, Araucanian
Quechua, Aymara
Zaparoan
Omurano, Cabela
Cahuapana
Leco, Sec, Culle, Xibito-Cholon, Catacao, Colan
Simacu
Jibaro-Kandoshi, Esmeralda, Cofan, Yaruro
Macro-Tucanoan
Tucano
Auixira
Catuquina, Ticuna, Muniche, Auaque, Caliana, 'Maku', Yuri, Canichana, Mobima
Puinave
Equatorial
Arawak
Chapacura-Uanhaman, Chamicuro, Apolista, Amuesha, Araua, Uru
Tupi
Ariqueme
Timote, Cariri, Zamuco, Guahibo-Pamigua, Saliban, Otomaco-Taparita, Mocoa, Tuyuneri, Yuruneri, Trumai, Cayuvava
Ge-Pano-Carib
Macro-Gê
Ge, Caingang, Camacan, Machacali, Puri, Pataxo, Malali, Coropo, Botocudo, Chiquita, Guato, Fulnio, Oti
Bororo
Caraja
Macro-Panoan
Tacana-Pano, Moseten, Mataco, Lule, Vilela, Mascoy, Charrua, Guaycuru-Opaie

Source:

Other non-indigenous languages

In Brazil, Italian and German dialects, specifically Talian, East Pomeranian, and Hunsrik, have co-official status alongside Portuguese in about a dozen cities and are mandatory subjects in schools in other municipalities. The states of Santa Catarina and Rio Grande do Sul have Talian officially approved as a heritage language in these states, and Espírito Santo has the East Pomeranian dialect, along with the German language as cultural heritage.

English is an official language in Guyana, and its creole form is the country’s most widely spoken language. English is also the official language in the territories of the Falkland Islands (Spanish: Islas Malvinas) and South Georgia and the South Sandwich Islands.

French is the official language in French Guiana, an overseas region of France. Dutch is the official language in neighboring Suriname.

Italian is spoken by communities in Argentina, Uruguay, Venezuela, and Brazil.

German is used by some in Brazil, Paraguay, Chile, Ecuador, Uruguay, Venezuela, and Colombia.

Welsh is spoken and written in the historic towns of Trelew and Rawson in Argentine Patagonia.

There are also small clusters of Japanese speakers in Brazil, Peru, and Bolivia (including Okinawans from the island of Okinawa). Brazil currently holds the largest Japanese community outside Japan.

Caribbean Hindustani is spoken by the Indo-Guyanese and the Indo-Surinamese. In Suriname, the language is known as Sarnami Hindoestani and is still widely spoken. However, in Guyana, where it is known as Aili Gaili, the language is nearly extinct as a spoken language, with only words and phrases still remaining.

Javanese is spoken by the Javanese Surinamese who form about 14% of the country's population.

Sranan Tongo, an English-based creole, serves as one of the lingua francas of Suriname, alongside Dutch.

Other non-indigenous languages spoken include Arabic, Chinese, Romani, Haitian Creole, Romanian, Greek, Polish, Ukrainian, and Russian.

See also
Languages in censuses
Indigenous languages of South America
List of unclassified languages of South America
List of extinct languages of South America
Extinct languages of the Marañón River basin

References

External links

South American Indigenous Language Structures
SAPhon – South American Phonological Inventories
Sound comparisons for various South American languages
Diachronic Atlas of Comparative Linguistics (DiACL)